The CWA Submission Shootfighting Championship was a professional wrestling singles championship in the German professional wrestling promotion Catch Wrestling Association (CWA). The championship was contested under 10 three-minute rounds.

Title history

Key

Reigns

References

External links
CWA Submission Shootfighting Championship at Cagematch

Catch Wrestling Association championships